General Maitland may refer to:

Sir Alexander Maitland, 1st Baronet (1728–1820), British Army general
Edward Maitland (RAF officer) (1880–1921), British Army brigadier general and later a Royal Air Force air commodore
Frederick Maitland (1763–1848), British Army general
Lester J. Maitland (1899–1990), U.S. Army Air Force brigadier general
Peregrine Maitland (1777–1854), British Army general
Thomas Maitland (British Army officer) (1760–1824), British Army lieutenant general

See also
Edward Maitland-Makgill-Crichton (1916–2009), British Army major general